Ivo Watts-Russell (born 1954) is a British music producer and record label executive. He was joint-founder with Peter Kent of the indie record label 4AD. He has produced several records, although he prefers to use the term "musical director".

Early years
Watts-Russell was born in Edinburgh,the youngest of eight children of Major David Watts-Russell and Gina Spinola (née Baker); he "never related emotionally" to either of his parents, and grew up "on a dilapidated Northamptonshire estate in an atmosphere of almost Victorian froideur". He was educated at Oundle School. His paternal grandfather, Captain Arthur Egerton Birch, of the Coldstream Guards (son of the colonial administrator Sir Arthur Nonus Birch), took his mother's surname at the age of 21, she being of the Watts-Russell gentry family formerly of Ilam Hall, Staffordshire. Captain Arthur Egerton Watts-Russell married Sylvia Grenfell, of the family of the Barons Grenfell, through whom Ivo Watts-Russell is a cousin of the war poet Julian Grenfell. 

In 1977, he joined Beggars Banquet Records as they were starting their label.

Career
One of his better-known productions is the Cocteau Twins' debut Garlands. (He is the namesake of "Ivo", the lead track of Cocteau Twins' 1984 album, Treasure.) He also led This Mortal Coil, writing and selecting songs; choosing the personnel for each song; and occasionally playing keyboards. A few years after the release of This Mortal Coil's final studio album, he founded and produced a band called The Hope Blister. which released two albums: ...smile's OK (1998) and Underarms (1999). Although 4AD first released Underarms as a limited edition CD, the label reissued it in 2005 as Underarms and Sideways, the second disc of which has seven remixes by Markus Guentner.

Later years
He had a nervous breakdown in 1994 and sold his half of 4AD to Martin Mills in 1999. He moved to Santa Fe in the US where he still lives.

References

External links 
Official 4AD website

Living people
4AD
People from Northamptonshire
People educated at Oundle School
1954 births
English record producers
People from Santa Fe, New Mexico
This Mortal Coil members